XHBM-FM 105.7/XEBM-AM 820 is a combo radio station in San Luis Potosí, San Luis Potosí. It is known as Ke Buena and carries a grupera format.

History

XEBM received its first concession in March 1940. It was owned by Benjamín Briones Muñoz and broadcast at 1260 kHz. By the 1960s it had moved to 920, and in 1994 it became an AM-FM combo. The AM station would later move further down to 820.

820 AM is a United States clear-channel frequency, on which WBAP in Dallas, Texas and KCBF in Fairbanks, Alaska are the dominant Class A stations.

The station was owned by Organización Editorial Tangamanga until being sold to GlobalMedia. From 2005 to 2013, the station was known as La Mera Mera, and between 2013 and 2016 it was known as Poder 105.7 before picking up the Ke Buena national format.

References

Radio stations in San Luis Potosí
Radio stations established in 1940
1940 establishments in Mexico